John F. Bowman (May 27, 1880 – August 31, 1960) was an American attorney and politician who served as the 20th mayor of Salt Lake City from 1928 to 1931. During his tenure as mayor, Bowman managed the city's water department. During World War II, he served as an attorney for the Office of Price Administration.

References

1880 births
1960 deaths
Mayors of Salt Lake City
Utah Republicans